Darwin 1942 is a 1986 Australian TV movie about the bombing of Darwin.

References

External links

1986 television films
1986 films
Australian television films
Films set in 1942
Pacific War films
Australian World War II films
1980s English-language films